The 1960s (pronounced "nineteen-sixties", shortened to the "60s" or the "Sixties") was a decade that began on 1 January 1960, and ended on 31 December 1969.

In the United States and other Western countries, the Sixties is noted for its counterculture. There was a revolution in social norms, including clothing, music (such as the Altamont Free Concert), drugs, dress, sexuality, formalities, civil rights, precepts of military duty, and schooling. Others denounce the decade as one of irresponsible excess, flamboyance, the decay of social order, and the fall or relaxation of social taboos. A wide range of music emerged; from popular music inspired by and including the Beatles (in the United States known as the British Invasion), the folk music revival, to the poetic lyrics of Bob Dylan. In the United States the Sixties were also called the "cultural decade" while in the United Kingdom (especially London) it was called the Swinging Sixties.

Organizations such as those present at May 1968, the German Red Army Faction, and the Japanese Zengakuren tested liberal democracy's ability to help people left out of society in the post-industrial age hybrid capitalist economies. In the United Kingdom, the Labour Party gained power in 1964 with Harold Wilson as Prime Minister through most of the decade. In France, the protests of 1968 led to President Charles de Gaulle temporarily fleeing the country. Italy formed its first left-of-center government in March 1962 with a coalition of Christian Democrats, Social Democrats, and moderate Republicans. When Aldo Moro became Prime Minister in 1963, Socialists joined the ruling block too. Soviet leaders during the decade were Nikita Khrushchev until 1964 and Leonid Brezhnev. In Brazil, João Goulart became president after Jânio Quadros resigned.

The United States had four presidents that served during the decade; Dwight D. Eisenhower, John F. Kennedy, Lyndon B. Johnson and Richard Nixon. Eisenhower was near the end of his term and left office in January 1961, and Kennedy was assassinated in 1963. Kennedy had wanted a Keynesian and staunch anti-communist social reforms. These were passed under Johnson including civil rights for African Americans and healthcare for the elderly and the poor. Despite his large-scale Great Society programs, Johnson was increasingly disliked by the New Left at home and abroad. For some, May 1968 meant the end of traditional collective action and the beginning of a new era to be dominated mainly by the so-called new social movements.

After President Kennedy's assassination, direct tensions between the superpower countries of US and Soviet Union developed into a contest with proxy wars, insurgency funding, puppet governments and other overall influence mainly in Latin America, Africa, and Asia. This "Cold War" dominated the world's geopolitics during the decade. Africa was in a period of radical political change as 32 countries gained independence from their European colonial rulers. The heavy-handed American role in the Vietnam War lead to an anti-Vietnam War movement with outraged student protestors around the globe.

By the end of the 1950s, post-war reconstructed Europe and began an economic boom. World War II had closed up social classes with remnants of the old feudal gentry disappearing. A developing upper-working-class (a newly redefined middle-class) in Western Europe could afford a radio, television, refrigerator and motor vehicles. The Soviet Union and other Warsaw Pact countries were improving quickly after rebuilding from WWII. Real GDP growth averaged 6% a year during the second half of the decade; overall, the worldwide economy prospered in the 1960s with expansion of the middle class and the increase of new domestic technology.

During the 1960s, the world population increased from 3.0 to 3.7 billion people. There were approximately 1.15 billion births and 500 million deaths.

Politics and wars

Wars

 The Cold War (1947–1991)
 The Vietnam War (1955–1975)
 1961 – Substantial (approximately 700) American advisory forces first arrive in Vietnam.
 1962 – By mid-1962, the number of U.S. military advisers in South Vietnam had risen from 900 to 12,000. 
 1963 – By the time of U.S. President John F. Kennedy's death there were 16,000 American military personnel in South Vietnam, up from Eisenhower's 900 advisors to cope with rising guerrilla activity in Vietnam.
 1964 – In direct response to the minor naval engagement known as the Gulf of Tonkin incident which occurred on 2 August 1964, the Gulf of Tonkin Resolution, a joint resolution of the U.S. Congress, was passed on 10 August 1964. The resolution gave U.S. President Lyndon B. Johnson authorization, without a formal declaration of war by Congress, for the use of military force in Southeast Asia. The Johnson administration subsequently cited the resolution as legal authority for its rapid escalation of U.S. military involvement in the Vietnam War.
 1966 – After 1966, with the draft in place more than 500,000 troops are sent to Vietnam by the Johnson administration and college attendance soars.
 The Bay of Pigs Invasion (1961) – an unsuccessful attempt by a CIA-trained force of Cuban exiles to invade southern Cuba with support from U.S. government armed forces, to overthrow the Cuban government of Fidel Castro.
 Portuguese Colonial War (1961–1974) – the war was fought between Portugal's military and the emerging nationalist movements in Portugal's African colonies. It was a decisive ideological struggle and armed conflict of the cold war in African (Portuguese Africa and surrounding nations) and European (mainland Portugal) scenarios. Unlike other European nations, the Portuguese regime did not leave its African colonies, or the overseas provinces, during the 1950s and 1960s. During the 1960s, various armed independence movements, most prominently led by communist-led parties who cooperated under the CONCP umbrella and pro-U.S. groups, became active in these areas, most notably in Angola, Mozambique, and Portuguese Guinea. During the war, several atrocities were committed by all forces involved in the conflict. 
 The Indonesia–Malaysia confrontation began in January 1963 and ended in August 1966. 
 Sino-Indian War of 1962 occurred between China and India over a border dispute. 
 The Indo-Pakistani War of 1965 began in September.
 Arab–Israeli conflict (early-20th century-present)
 Six-Day War (June 1967) – a war between Israel and the neighboring states of Egypt, Jordan, and Syria. The Arab states of Iraq, Saudi Arabia, Sudan, Tunisia, Morocco and Algeria also contributed troops and arms. At the war's end, Israel had gained control of the Sinai Peninsula, the Gaza Strip, the West Bank, East Jerusalem, and the Golan Heights. The results of the war affect the geopolitics of the region to this day.

 The Algerian War came to a close in 1962.
 The Nigeria Civil War began in 1967.
 Civil wars in Laos and Sudan rage on throughout the decade.
 The Al-Wadiah War was a military conflict which broke out on 27 November 1969, between Saudi Arabia and the People's Republic of South Yemen.

Internal conflicts
 The massive 1960 Anpo protests in Japan against the U.S.-Japan Security Treaty were the largest and longest protests in Japan's history. Although they ultimately failed to stop the treaty, they forced the resignation of Japanese Prime Minister Nobusuke Kishi and the cancellation of a planned visit to Japan by U.S. President Dwight D. Eisenhower.
 The Congo Crisis was a period of political upheaval and conflict in the Republic of the Congo between 1960 and 1965 that ended with the establishment of a unitary state led by Mobutu Sese Seko.
 The Indonesian mass killings of 1965–66 occurred as part of the Transition to the New Order that marked the beginning of Suharto's 31-year presidency.
 Cultural Revolution in China (1966–1976) – a period of widespread social and political upheaval in the People's Republic of China which was launched by Mao Zedong, the chairman of the Chinese Communist Party. Mao alleged that "liberal bourgeois" elements were permeating the party and society at large and that they wanted to restore capitalism. Mao insisted that these elements be removed through post-revolutionary class struggle by mobilizing the thoughts and actions of China's youth, who formed Red Guards groups around the country. The movement subsequently spread into the military, urban workers, and the party leadership itself. Although Mao himself officially declared the Cultural Revolution to have ended in 1969, the power struggles and political instability between 1969 and the arrest of the Gang of Four in 1976 are now also widely regarded as part of the Revolution.
The Naxalite movement in India began in 1967 with an armed uprising of tribals against local landlords in the village of Naxalbari, West Bengal, led by certain leaders of the Communist Party of India (Marxist). The movement was influenced by Mao Zedong's ideology and spread to many tribal districts in Eastern India, gaining strong support among the radical urban youth. After counter-insurgency operations by the police, military and paramilitary forces, the movement fragmented but is still active in many districts.
 The Troubles in Northern Ireland began with the rise of the Northern Ireland civil rights movement in the mid-1960s, the conflict continued into the later 1990s.
 The Compton's Cafeteria Riot occurred in August 1966 in the Tenderloin district of San Francisco. This incident was one of the first recorded transgender riots in United States history, preceding the more famous 1969 Stonewall Riots in New York City by three years.
 The Stonewall riots occurred in June 1969 in New York City. The Stonewall riots were a series of spontaneous, violent demonstrations against a police raid that took place in the Stonewall Inn, in the Greenwich Village neighborhood of New York City. They are frequently cited as the first instance in American history when people in the homosexual community fought back against a government-sponsored system that persecuted sexual minorities, and they have become the defining event that marked the start of the gay rights movement in the United States and around the world.
 In 1967, the National Farmers Organization withheld milk supplies for 15 days as part of an effort to induce a quota system to stabilize prices.
 The May 1968 student and worker uprisings in France.
 Mass socialist or Communist movement in most European countries (particularly France and Italy), with which the student-based new left was involved. The most spectacular manifestation of this was the May student revolt of 1968 in Paris that linked up with a general strike of ten million workers called by the trade unions; and for a few days seemed capable of overthrowing the government of Charles de Gaulle. De Gaulle went off to visit French troops in Germany to check on their loyalty. Major concessions were won for trade union rights, higher minimum wages and better working conditions.
 University students protested in the hundreds of thousands against the Vietnam War in London, Paris, Berlin and Rome.
 In Eastern Europe students also drew inspiration from the protests in the West. In Poland and Yugoslavia they protested against restrictions on free speech by communist regimes.
 The Tlatelolco massacre – was a government massacre of student and civilian protesters and bystanders that took place during the afternoon and night of 2 October 1968, in the Plaza de las Tres Culturas in the Tlatelolco section of Mexico City.

Coups

Prominent coups d'état of the decade included:
 On 27 May 1960, a coup in Turkey led by Cemal Gürsel and Cemal Madanoğlu overthrew the government of Adnan Menderes.
 On 16 May 1961, a coup in South Korea led by army officer Park Chung-hee made the establishment of temporary military rule.
 In 1963, a coup in South Vietnam leads to the death of President Ngô Đình Diệm and the establishment of temporary military rule.
 On 31 March and 1 April 1964, a military coup in Brazil overthrows President João Goulart and starts a 21-year period of military dictatorship.
 On 21 April 1967, in Greece a group of colonels established a military dictatorship for seven years.
 In 1968, a coup in Iraq led to the overthrow of Abdul Rahman Arif by the Arab Socialist Baath Party.
 On 1 September 1969, a small group of military officers led by the army officer Muammar Gaddafi overthrows monarchy in Libya.

Nuclear threats

 The Cuban Missile Crisis ( 16–28 October 1962) – a near-military confrontation between the U.S. and the Soviet Union about the presence of Soviet missiles in Cuba. After an American Naval (quarantine) blockade of Cuba the Soviet Union under the leadership of Nikita Khrushchev agreed to remove their missiles from Cuba in exchange for the U.S. removing its missiles from Turkey.
 On 13 February 1960, France detonated its first atomic bomb. France possessed a hydrogen bomb by 1968.
 On 16 October 1964, China detonated its first atomic bomb. China possessed a hydrogen bomb by 1967.

Decolonization and independence
 The transformation of Africa from colonialism to independence in what is known as the decolonisation of Africa dramatically accelerated during the decade, with 32 countries gaining independence between 1960 and 1968, marking the end of the European empires that once dominated the African continent. However, many of these new post-colonial states would struggle with internal and external issues including famine, corruption, genocide, disease, and violent conflicts in the 1960s and succeeding decades. Many of these issues were caused or exacerbated by American and Soviet involvement during the Cold War with each side supporting various strongmen, dictators, and guerillas favorable to their causes in these countries. Economic development on the continent has been difficult, but many nations who decolonized in the 1960s began to see a rebound and unprecedented growth in the first quarter of the 21st century. As a whole, Africa's GDP rose by an average of over 6% a year between 2013 and 2022, a rate only outpaced by China.

Prominent political events

North America

United States
 1960 – 1960 United States presidential election – The very close campaign was the series of four Kennedy–Nixon debates; they were the first presidential debates held on television. Kennedy won a close election.
 1961 – President John F. Kennedy promised some more aggressive confrontation with the Soviet Union; he also established the Peace Corps.
 1963 – Betty Friedan published the book The Feminine Mystique, reawakening the feminist movement and being largely responsible for its second wave.
 1963 – Civil rights becomes a central issue, as the Birmingham campaign and Birmingham riot lead to President Kennedy's Civil Rights Address, Martin Luther King Jr.'s "I Have a Dream" speech at the March on Washington, and the 16th Street Baptist Church Bombing
 1963 – Kennedy was assassinated and replaced by Vice President Lyndon Johnson. The nation was in shock. For the next half-century, conspiracy theorists concocted numerous alternative explanations to the official report that a lone gunman killed Kennedy.
 1964 – Johnson pressed for civil rights legislation. Civil Rights Act of 1964 signed into law by President Lyndon B. Johnson. This landmark piece of legislation in the United States outlawed racial segregation in schools, public places, and employment. The first black riots erupt in major cities.
 1964 – Johnson was reelected over Conservative spokesman Senator Barry Goldwater by wide landslide; Liberals gained full control of Congress.
 1964 – Wilderness Act signed into law by President Lyndon B. Johnson on 3 September.
 1965 – After the events of the Selma to Montgomery marches the National Voting Rights Act of 1965 was lobbied for, and then signed into law, by President Lyndon B. Johnson. The Voting Rights Act outlawed discriminatory voting practices that had caused the widespread disenfranchisement of African Americans in the United States.
 1968 – U.S. President Richard M. Nixon was elected defeating Vice President Hubert H. Humphrey in November.
 1969 – U.S. President Richard Nixon was inaugurated in January 1969; promised "peace with honor" to end the Vietnam War.

Canada
 The Quiet Revolution in Quebec altered the province-city-state into a more secular society. The Jean Lesage Liberal government created a welfare state État-Providence and fomented the rise of active nationalism among Francophone French-speaking Quebecer Québécois.
 On 15 February 1965, the new Flag of Canada was adopted in Canada, after much anticipated debate known as the Great Canadian Flag Debate.
 In 1960, the Canadian Bill of Rights becomes law, and suffrage, and the right for any Canadian citizen to vote, was finally adopted by John Diefenbaker's Progressive Conservative government. The new election act allowed First Nations people to vote for the first time.

Mexico
 The student and New Left protests in 1968 coincided with political upheavals in a number of other countries. Although these events often sprung from completely different causes, they were influenced by reports and images of what was happening in the United States and France.

Europe

 British Prime Minister Harold Macmillan delivered his "Wind of Change" speech in 1960.
 Construction of the Berlin Wall 1961 to prevent East Germans from escaping to the West.
 Pope John XXIII calls the Second Vatican Council of the Catholic Church, continued by Pope Paul VI (after John XXIII died in 1963), which met from 11 October 1962, until 8 December 1965.
 In October 1964, Soviet leader Nikita Khrushchev was expelled from office due to his increasingly erratic and authoritarian behavior. Leonid Brezhnev and Alexei Kosygin then became the new leaders of the Soviet Union.
 In Czechoslovakia, 1968 was the year of Alexander Dubček's Prague Spring, a source of inspiration to many Western leftists who admired Dubček's "socialism with a human face". The Soviet invasion of Czechoslovakia in August ended these hopes and also fatally damaged the chances of the orthodox communist parties drawing many recruits from the student protest movement.

Asia

China
 The Cultural Revolution (1966–1976) and the Sino-Soviet split (1961–1989)
 Relations with the United States remained hostile during the 1960s, although representatives from both countries held periodic meetings in Warsaw, Poland (since there was no US embassy in China). President Kennedy had plans to restore China-US relations, but his assassination, the war in Vietnam, and the Cultural Revolution put an end to that. Not until Richard Nixon took office in 1969 was there another opportunity.
 Following Soviet leader Nikita Khrushchev's expulsion in 1964, Sino-Soviet relations devolved into open hostility. The Chinese were deeply disturbed by the Soviet suppression of the Prague Spring in 1968, as the latter now claimed the right to intervene in any country it saw as deviating from the correct path of socialism. Finally, in March 1969, armed clashes took place along the Sino-Soviet border in the former Manchuria. This drove the Chinese to restore relations with the US, as Mao Zedong decided that the Soviet Union was a much greater threat against them.

India
 In India a literary and cultural movement started in Calcutta, Patna, and other cities by a group of writers and painters who called themselves "Hungryalists", or members of the Hungry generation. The band of writers wanted to change virtually everything and were arrested with several cases filed against them on various charges. They ultimately won these cases.

Indonesia
 The Transition to the New Order (1965–1968)
 In the early hours of 1 October 1965, a group of army officers launched an abortive coup d'état in Jakarta, assassinated six senior Indonesian Army generals and a junior army officer. They also seized Merdeka Square and later in the morning, proclaimed the establishment of the "Council of Revolution" through a radio broadcast, with Liutenant Colonel Untung Syamsuri as its leader. 
 On the same day, Major General Suharto successfully persuaded the soldiers on Merdeka Square to join forces with the Indonesian Army Strategic Reserves Command divisions and launched a counterattack on the movement, ending the coup attempt effectively. Three days later, the bodies of seven army officers were found buried in an old well in Lubang Buaya and the bodies were recovered. 
 In the aftermath of the coup d'état attempt, the people blamed the attempt on the Communist Party of Indonesia, prompt a mass purge against leftists and communist sympathizers across the country. Around 500,000-1,000,000 casualties were massacred. The killings were mostly done by the locals with the help of the Army. 
 Soon, mass demonstrations and protests from Indonesian Students' Action Front against President Sukarno's government occurred. President Sukarno was notorious for his friendly approach towards the leftists, particularly the Communist Party of Indonesia.
 In the climax of the protests, President Sukarno signed Supersemar on 11 March 1966, effectively gave authority to Major General Suharto to restore order and ensure security in the country. In 1967, President Sukarno was stripped of his political power by the Provisional People's Consultative Assembly (MPRS) and Major General Suharto became acting president. Later, he became president formally on 27 March 1968. Sukarno lived under house arrest until his death in June 1970.

Japan and South Korea
 The Japanese economic miracle (1960s–1990s)
 Japan's remarkable economic economic growth between the post-World War II era and the end of the Cold War. During the economic boom, Japan rapidly became the world's second-largest economy at the time (after the United States).
 In 1960, Japan was wracked by the massive Anpo protests against the revision of the U.S.-Japan Security Treaty, resulting in the resignation of Prime Minister Nobusuke Kishi; Kishi's successor Hayato Ikeda began implementing economic policies, known as the Income Doubling Plan removed most of Japan's anti-monopoly laws and promised to double the size of Japan's economy within 10 years. Eisaku Satō became Prime Minister of Japan four years later, succeeding Ikeda due to health issues.
 The 1964 Summer Olympics were held in Japan, the first time the country hosted them and the first time that the Olympic Games were held in Asia. The start of operations for the world's first bullet train, the Tōkaidō Shinkansen) between Tokyo Station and Shin-Ōsaka Station, it is the oldest high-speed rail system in the world.
 The Second and Third Republics of Korea (1960–1972)
 The April Revolution were a mass protests in South Korea against President Syngman Rhee and the First Republic from 11 to 26 April 1960 which led to Rhee's resignation. The Second Republic was established as a parliamentary government under President Yun Bo-seon and Prime Minister Chang Myon. The Second Republic ended the First Republic, formed a liberal democracy, and formulated the first Five-Year Plans to develop the formerly neglected economy.
 The May 16 coup and the establishment of the SCNR, led by Major General Park Chung-hee on 16 May 1961, put an effective end to the Second Republic. Park was one of a group of military leaders who had been pushing for the de-politicization of the military.
 The Miracle on the Han River began with the Five-Year Plans of South Korea was an economic development projects implemented by President Park Chung-hee, South Korea received US$800 million from Japan under property claims, and was mostly dependent on foreign aid, largely from the U.S. in exchange for South Korea's involvement in the Vietnam War.
 South Korea's first diplomatic relations with Japan were established under the Third Republic, and South Korea-Japan relations were normalized in the Treaty on Basic Relations signed on 22 July 1965, and in an agreement ratified on 14 August 1965. Japan agreed to provide a large amount of compensation, grants, and loans to South Korea, and the two countries began economic and political cooperation.

Africa
 On 1 September 1969, the Libyan monarchy was overthrown, and a radical, revolutionary, government headed by Col. Muammar al-Gadaffi took power.
 On 1 October 1960, Nigeria gained its independence from Great Britain.

South America
 In 1964, a successful coup against the democratically elected government of Brazilian president João Goulart, initiated a military dictatorship that caused over 20 years of oppression.
 The Argentine revolutionary Ernesto "Che" Guevara travelled to Africa and then Bolivia in his campaigning to spread worldwide revolution. He was captured and executed in 1967 by the Bolivian army, and afterwards became an iconic figure for the left wing around the world.
 Juan Velasco Alvarado took power by a coup in Peru in 1968.

Economics

The decade began with a recession from 1960 to 1961, at that time unemployment was considered high at around 7%. In his campaign, John F. Kennedy promised to "get America moving again." His goal was economic growth of 4–6% per year and unemployment below 4%. To do this, he instituted a 7% tax credit for businesses that invest in new plants and equipment. By the end of the decade, median family income had risen from $8,540 in 1963 to $10,770 by 1969.

Although the first half of the decade had low inflation, by 1966 Kennedy's tax credit had reduced unemployment to 3.7% and inflation remained below 2%. With the economy booming Johnson began his "Great Society" which vastly expanded social programs. By the end of the decade under Nixon, the combined inflation and unemployment rate known as the misery index (economics) had exploded to nearly 10% with inflation at 6.2% and unemployment at 3.5% and by 1975 the misery index was almost 20%.

Assassinations and attempts

Prominent assassinations, targeted killings, and assassination attempts include:

Disasters
Natural:
 The 1960 Valdivia earthquake, also known as the Great Chilean earthquake, is to date the most powerful earthquake ever recorded, rating 9.5 on the moment magnitude scale. It caused localized tsunamis that severely battered the Chilean coast, with waves up to 25 meters (82 ft). The main tsunami raced across the Pacific Ocean and devastated Hilo, Hawaii.
 1963 Skopje earthquake was a 6.1 moment magnitude earthquake which occurred in Skopje, SR Macedonia (present-day Republic of Macedonia) on 26 July 1963, which killed over 1,070 people, injured between 3,000 and 4,000 and left more than 200,000 people homeless. About 80% of the city was destroyed.
 1963 – Vajont dam disaster – The Vajont dam flood in Italy was caused by a mountain sliding in the dam and causing a flood wave that killed approximately 2,000 people in the towns in its path.
 1964 – The Good Friday earthquake, the most powerful earthquake recorded in the U.S. and North America, struck Alaska and killed 143 people.
 1965 – Hurricane Betsy caused severe damage to the U.S. Gulf Coast, especially in the state of Louisiana.
 1969 – The Cuyahoga River caught fire in Ohio. Fires had erupted on the river many times, including 22 June 1969, when a river fire captured the attention of Time magazine, which described the Cuyahoga as the river that "oozes rather than flows" and in which a person "does not drown but decays." This helped spur legislative action on water pollution control resulting in the Clean Water Act, Great Lakes Water Quality Agreement, and the creation of the federal Environmental Protection Agency.
 1969 – Hurricane Camille hit the U.S. Gulf Coast at Category 5 Status. It peaked and made landfall with 175 mph (280 km/h) winds and caused $1.42 billion (1969 USD) in damages.

Non-natural:
 On 16 December 1960, a United Airlines DC-8 and a Trans World Airlines Lockheed Constellation collided over New York City and crashed, killing 134 people.
 On 15 February 1961, Sabena Flight 548 crashed on its way to Brussels, Belgium, killing all 72 passengers on board and 1 person on the ground. Among those killed were all 18 members of the US figure skating team, on their way to the World Championships. 
 On 16 March 1962, Flying Tiger Line Flight 739, a Lockheed Super Constellation, inexplicably disappeared over the Western Pacific, leaving all 107 on board presumed dead. Since the wreckage of the aircraft is lost to this day, the cause of the crash remains a mystery.
 On 3 June 1962, Air France Flight 007, a Boeing 707, crashed on takeoff from Paris. 130 people were killed in the crash while 2 survived.
 On 20 May 1965, PIA Flight 705 crashed on approach to Cairo, Egypt. 121 died while 6 survived.
 On 4 February 1966, All Nippon Airways Flight 60, a Boeing 727, plunged into Tokyo Bay for reasons unknown. All 133 people on board died.
 On 5 March 1966, BOAC Flight 911 broke up in mid-air and crashed on the slopes of Mount Fuji. All 124 aboard died.
 On 8 December 1966, the car ferry SS Heraklion sank in the Aegean Sea during a storm, killing 217 people.
 On 16 March 1969, a DC-9 operating Viasa Flight 742 crashed in the Venezuelan city of Maracaibo. A total of 155 people died in the crash.

Social and political movements

Counterculture and social revolution

In the second half of the decade, young people began to revolt against the conservative norms of the time, as well as remove themselves from mainstream liberalism, in particular the high level of materialism which was so common during the era. This created a "counterculture" that sparked a social revolution throughout much of the Western world. It began in the United States as a reaction against the conservatism and social conformity of the 1950s, and the U.S. government's extensive military intervention in Vietnam. The youth involved in the popular social aspects of the movement became known as hippies. These groups created a movement toward liberation in society, including the sexual revolution, questioning authority and government, and demanding more freedoms and rights for women and minorities. The Underground Press, a widespread, eclectic collection of newspapers served as a unifying medium for the counterculture. The movement was also marked by the first widespread, socially accepted drug use (including LSD and marijuana) and psychedelic music.

Anti-war movement

The war in Vietnam would eventually lead to a commitment of over half a million American troops, resulting in over 58,500 American deaths and producing a large-scale antiwar movement in the United States. As late as the end of 1965, few Americans protested the American involvement in Vietnam, but as the war dragged on and the body count continued to climb, civil unrest escalated. Students became a powerful and disruptive force and university campuses sparked a national debate over the war. As the movement's ideals spread beyond college campuses, doubts about the war also began to appear within the administration itself. A mass movement began rising in opposition to the Vietnam War, ending in the massive Moratorium protests in 1969, as well as the movement of resistance to conscription ("the Draft") for the war.

The antiwar movement was initially based on the older 1950s Peace movement, heavily influenced by the American Communist Party, but by the mid-1960s it outgrew this and became a broad-based mass movement centered in universities and churches: one kind of protest was called a "sit-in". Other terms heard in the United States included "the Draft", "draft dodger", "conscientious objector", and "Vietnam vet". Voter age-limits were challenged by the phrase: "If you're old enough to die for your country, you're old enough to vote."

Civil rights movement

Beginning in the mid-1950s and continuing into the late 1960s, African-Americans in the United States aimed at outlawing racial discrimination against black Americans and voting rights to them. This article covers the phase of the movement between 1955 and 1968, particularly in the South. The emergence of the Black Power movement, which lasted roughly from 1966 to 1975, enlarged the aims of the civil rights movement to include racial dignity, economic and political self-sufficiency, and anti-imperialism.

The movement was characterized by major campaigns of civil resistance. Between 1955 and 1968, acts of civil disobedience and nonviolent protest produced crisis situations between activists and government authorities. Federal, state, and local governments, businesses, and communities often had to respond immediately to these situations that highlighted the inequities faced by African Americans. Forms of protest and/or civil disobedience included boycotts such as the successful Montgomery bus boycott (1955–1956) in Alabama; "sit-ins" such as the influential Greensboro sit-ins (1960) in North Carolina; marches, such as the Selma to Montgomery marches (1965) in Alabama; and a wide range of other nonviolent activities.

Noted legislative achievements during this phase of the civil rights movement were passage of Civil Rights Act of 1964, that banned discrimination based on "race, color, religion, or national origin" in employment practices and public accommodations; the Voting Rights Act of 1965, that restored and protected voting rights; the Immigration and Nationality Services Act of 1965, that dramatically opened entry to the U.S. to immigrants other than traditional European groups; and the Fair Housing Act of 1968, that banned discrimination in the sale or rental of housing.

Hispanic and Chicano movement
Another large ethnic minority group, the Mexican-Americans, are among other Hispanics in the U.S. who fought to end racial discrimination and socioeconomic disparity. The largest Mexican-American populations were in the Southwestern United States, such as California with over 1 million Chicanos in Los Angeles alone, and Texas where Jim Crow laws included Mexican-Americans as "non-white" in some instances to be legally segregated.

Socially, the Chicano Movement addressed what it perceived to be negative ethnic stereotypes of Mexicans in mass media and the American consciousness. It did so through the creation of works of literary and visual art that validated Mexican-American ethnicity and culture. Chicanos fought to end social stigmas such as the usage of the Spanish language and advocated official bilingualism in federal and state governments.

The Chicano Movement also addressed discrimination in public and private institutions. Early in the twentieth century, Mexican Americans formed organizations to protect themselves from discrimination. One of those organizations, the League of United Latin American Citizens, was formed in 1929 and remains active today.

The movement gained momentum after World War II when groups such as the American G.I. Forum, which was formed by returning Mexican American veterans, joined in the efforts by other civil rights organizations.

Mexican-American civil-rights activists achieved several major legal victories including the 1947 Mendez v. Westminster U.S. Supreme Court ruling which declared that segregating children of "Mexican and Latin descent" was unconstitutional and the 1954 Hernandez v. Texas ruling which declared that Mexican Americans and other racial groups in the United States were entitled to equal protection under the 14th Amendment of the U.S. Constitution.

The most prominent civil-rights organization in the Mexican-American community, the Mexican American Legal Defense and Educational Fund (MALDEF), was founded in 1968. Although modeled after the NAACP Legal Defense and Educational Fund, MALDEF has also taken on many of the functions of other organizations, including political advocacy and training of local leaders.

Meanwhile, Puerto Ricans in the U.S. mainland fought against racism, police brutality and socioeconomic problems affecting the three million Puerto Ricans residing in the 50 states. The main concentration of the population was in New York City.

In the 1960s and the following 1970s, Hispanic-American culture was on the rebound like ethnic music, foods, culture and identity both became popular and assimilated into the American mainstream. Spanish-language television networks, radio stations and newspapers increased in presence across the country, especially in U.S.–Mexican border towns and East Coast cities like New York City, and the growth of the Cuban American community in Miami, Florida.

The multitude of discrimination at this time represented an inhuman side to a society that in the 1960s was upheld as a world and industry leader. The issues of civil rights and warfare became major points of reflection of virtue and democracy, what once was viewed as traditional and inconsequential was now becoming the significance in the turning point of a culture. A document known as the Port Huron Statement exemplifies these two conditions perfectly in its first hand depiction, "while these and other problems either directly oppressed us or rankled our consciences and became our own subjective concerns, we began to see complicated and disturbing paradoxes in our surrounding America. The declaration "all men are created equal..." rang hollow before the facts of Negro life in the South and the big cities of the North. The proclaimed peaceful intentions of the United States contradicted its economic and military investments in the Cold War status quo." These intolerable issues became too visible to ignore therefore its repercussions were feared greatly, the realization that we as individuals take the responsibility for encounter and resolution in our lives issues was an emerging idealism of the 1960s.

Second-wave feminism

A second wave of feminism in the United States and around the world gained momentum in the early 1960s. While the first wave of the early 20th century was centered on gaining suffrage and overturning de jure inequalities, the second wave was focused on changing cultural and social norms and de facto inequalities associated with women. At the time, a woman's place was generally seen as being in the home, and they were excluded from many jobs and professions. In the U.S., a Presidential Commission on the Status of Women found discrimination against women in the workplace and every other aspect of life, a revelation which launched two decades of prominent women-centered legal reforms (i.e., the Equal Pay Act of 1963, Title IX, etc.) which broke down the last remaining legal barriers to women's personal freedom and professional success.

Feminists took to the streets, marching and protesting, authoring books and debating to change social and political views that limited women. In 1963, with Betty Friedan's book, The Feminine Mystique, the role of women in society, and in public and private life was questioned. By 1966, the movement was beginning to grow in size and power as women's group spread across the country and Friedan, along with other feminists, founded the National Organization for Women. In 1968, "Women's Liberation" became a household term as, for the first time, the new women's movement eclipsed the civil rights movement when New York Radical Women, led by Robin Morgan, protested the annual Miss America pageant in Atlantic City, New Jersey. The movement continued throughout the next decades. Gloria Steinem was a key feminist.

Gay rights movement

The United States, in the middle of a social revolution, led the world in LGBT rights in the late 1960s and early 1970s. Inspired by the civil-rights movement and the women's movement, early gay-rights pioneers had begun, by the 1960s, to build a movement. These groups were rather conservative in their practices, emphasizing that gay men and women are no different from those who are straight and deserve full equality. This philosophy would be dominant again after AIDS, but by the very end of the 1960s, the movement's goals would change and become more radical, demanding a right to be different, and encouraging gay pride.

The symbolic birth of the gay rights movement would not come until the decade had almost come to a close. Gays were not allowed by law to congregate. Gay establishments such as the Stonewall Inn in New York City were routinely raided by the police to arrest gay people. On a night in late June 1969, LGBT people resisted, for the first time, a police raid, and rebelled openly in the streets. This uprising called the Stonewall riots began a new period of the LGBT rights movement that in the next decade would cause dramatic change both inside the LGBT community and in the mainstream American culture.

New Left
The rapid rise of a "New Left" applied the class perspective of Marxism to postwar America but had little organizational connection with older Marxist organizations such as the Communist Party, and even went as far as to reject organized labor as the basis of a unified left-wing movement. Sympathetic to the ideology of C. Wright Mills, the New Left differed from the traditional left in its resistance to dogma and its emphasis on personal as well as societal change. Students for a Democratic Society (SDS) became the organizational focus of the New Left and was the prime mover behind the opposition to the War in Vietnam. The 1960s left also consisted of ephemeral campus-based Trotskyist, Maoist and anarchist groups, some of which by the end of the 1960s had turned to militancy.

Crime
The 1960s was also associated with a large increase in crime and urban unrest of all types. Between 1960 and 1969 reported incidence of violent crime per 100,000 people in the United States nearly doubled and have yet to return to the levels of the early 1960s. Large riots broke out in many cities like Chicago, Detroit, Los Angeles, New York City, Newark, New Jersey, Oakland, California and Washington, D.C. By the end of the decade, politicians like George Wallace and Richard Nixon campaigned on restoring law and order to a nation troubled with the new unrest.

Science and technology

Science

Space exploration

The Space Race between the United States and the Soviet Union dominated the 1960s. The Soviets sent the first man, Yuri Gagarin, into outer space during the Vostok 1 mission on 12 April 1961, and scored a host of other successes, but by the middle of the decade the U.S. was taking the lead. In May 1961, President Kennedy set the goal for the United States of landing a man on the Moon by the end of the 1960s.

In June 1963, Valentina Tereshkova became the first woman in space during the Vostok 6 mission. In 1965, Soviets launched the first probe to hit another planet of the Solar System (Venus), Venera 3, and the first probe to make a soft landing on and transmit from the surface of the Moon, Luna 9. In March 1966, the Soviet Union launched Luna 10, which became the first space probe to enter orbit around the Moon, and in September 1968, Zond 5 flew the first terrestrial beings, including two tortoises, to circumnavigate the Moon.

The deaths of astronauts Gus Grissom, Ed White, and Roger B. Chaffee in the Apollo 1 fire on 27 January 1967, put a temporary hold on the U.S. space program, but afterward progress was steady, with the Apollo 8 crew (Frank Borman, Jim Lovell, William Anders) being the first manned mission to orbit another celestial body (the Moon) during Christmas of 1968.

On 20 July 1969, Apollo 11, the first human spaceflight landed on the Moon. Launched on 16 July 1969, it carried mission Commander Neil Armstrong, Command Module Pilot Michael Collins, and the Lunar Module Pilot Buzz Aldrin. Apollo 11 fulfilled President John F. Kennedy's goal of reaching the Moon by the end of the 1960s, which he had expressed during a speech given before a joint session of Congress on 25 May 1961: "I believe that this nation should commit itself to achieving the goal, before this decade is out, of landing a man on the Moon and returning him safely to the Earth."

The Soviet program lost its sense of direction with the death of chief designer Sergey Korolyov in 1966. Political pressure, conflicts between different design bureaus, and engineering problems caused by an inadequate budget would doom the Soviet attempt to land men on the Moon.

A succession of unmanned American and Soviet probes traveled to the Moon, Venus, and Mars during the 1960s, and commercial satellites also came into use.

Other scientific developments

 1960 – The female birth-control contraceptive, the pill, was released in the United States after Food and Drug Administration (FDA) approval.
 1963 – The measles vaccine was released after being approved by the FDA
 1964 – The discovery and confirmation of the Cosmic microwave background in 1964 secured the Big Bang as the best theory of the origin and evolution of the universe. 
 1965 – AstroTurf introduced.
 1967 – First heart transplantation operation by Professor Christiaan Barnard in South Africa.
 1967 – Discovery of the first known pulsar (a rapidly spinning neutron star).
 During the late 1960s, the Green Revolution took a major leap in agricultural production.

Technology

Shinkansen, the world's first high-speed rail service began in 1964.

Automobiles
As the 1960s began, American cars showed a rapid rejection of 1950s styling excess, and would remain relatively clean and boxy for the entire decade. The horsepower race reached its climax in the late 1960s, with muscle cars sold by most makes. The compact Ford Mustang, launched in 1964, was one of the decade's greatest successes. The "Big Three" American automakers enjoyed their highest ever sales and profitability in the 1960s, but the demise of Studebaker in 1966 left American Motors Corporation as the last significant independent. The decade would see the car market split into different size classes for the first time, and model lineups now included compact and mid-sized cars in addition to full-sized ones.

The popular modern hatchback, with front-wheel-drive and a two-box configuration, was born in 1965 with the introduction of the Renault 16, many of this car's design principles live on in its modern counterparts: a large rear opening incorporating the rear window, foldable rear seats to extend boot space. The Mini, released in 1959, had first popularised the front wheel drive two-box configuration, but technically was not a hatchback as it had a fold-down bootlid.

Japanese cars also began to gain acceptance in the Western market, and popular economy models such as the Toyota Corolla, Datsun 510, and the first popular Japanese sports car, the Datsun 240Z, were released in the mid- to late-1960s.

Electronics and communications

 1960 – The first working laser was demonstrated in May by Theodore Maiman at Hughes Research Laboratories.
 1960 – Tony Hoare announces the Quicksort algorithm, the most common sorter on computers.
 1961 – Unimate, the first industrial robot, was introduced.
 1962 – First transatlantic satellite broadcast via the Telstar satellite.
 1962 – The first computer video game, Spacewar!, was invented.
 1962 – Red LEDs were developed.
 1963 – The first geosynchronous communications satellite, Syncom 2, is launched.
 1963 – First transpacific satellite broadcast via the Relay 1 satellite.
 1963 – Touch-Tone telephones introduced.
 1963 – Sketchpad was the first touch interactive computer graphics program.
 1963 – The Nottingham Electronic Valve company produced the first home video recorder called the "Telcan".
 1964 – 8-track tape audio format was developed.
 1964 – The Compact Cassette was introduced.
 1964 – The first successful Minicomputer, Digital Equipment Corporation's 12-bit PDP-8, was marketed.
 1964 – The programming language BASIC was created.
 1964 – The world's first supercomputer, the CDC 6600, was introduced.
 1964 – Fairchild Semiconductor released ICs with dual in-line packaging.
 1967 – PAL and SECAM broadcast color television systems started publicly transmitting in Europe.
 1967 – The first Automatic Teller Machine was opened in Barclays Bank, London.
 1968 – Ralph Baer developed his Brown Box (a working prototype of the Magnavox Odyssey).
 1968 – The first public demonstration of the computer mouse, the paper paradigm Graphical user interface, video conferencing, teleconferencing, email, and hypertext.
 1969 – ARPANET, the research-oriented prototype of the Internet, was introduced.
 1969 – CCD invented at AT&T Bell Labs, used as the electronic imager in still and video cameras.

Additional notable worldwide events
 The Manson murders occurred between 8–10 August 1969, when actress Sharon Tate, coffee heiress Abigail Folger, and several others were brutally murdered in the Tate residence by Charles Manson's "family." Rosemary LaBianca & Leno LaBianca were also murdered by the Manson family the following night.
 Canada celebrated its 100th anniversary of Confederation in 1967 by hosting Expo 67, the World's Fair, in Montreal, Quebec. During the anniversary celebrations, French president Charles De Gaulle visited Canada, and caused a considerable uproar by declaring his support for Québécois independence.

Popular culture
The most prominent events and trends in popular culture of the decade (particularly in the Anglosphere) include:

The counterculture movement dominated the second half of the 1960s, its most famous moments being the Summer of Love in San Francisco in 1967, and the Woodstock Festival in upstate New York in 1969. Psychedelic drugs, especially LSD, were widely used medicinally, spiritually and recreationally throughout the late 1960s, and were popularized by Timothy Leary with his slogan "Turn on, tune in, drop out". Ken Kesey and the Merry Pranksters also played a part in the role of "turning heads on". Psychedelic influenced the music, artwork and films of the decade, and a number of prominent musicians died of drug overdoses (see 27 Club). There was a growing interest in Eastern religions and philosophy, and many attempts were made to found communes, which varied from supporting free love to religious puritanism.

Music

 
The rock 'n' roll movement of the 1950s quickly came to an end in 1959 with the Day the Music Died (as explained in the song "American Pie"), the scandal of Jerry Lee Lewis' marriage to his 13-year-old cousin, and the induction of Elvis Presley into the United States Army. As the 1960s began, the major rock 'n' roll stars of the '50s such as Chuck Berry and Little Richard had dropped off the charts and popular music in the U.S. came to be dominated by girl groups, surf music, novelty pop songs, clean-cut teen idols, and Motown music. Another important change in music during the early 1960s was the American folk music revival which introduced Bob Dylan, Joan Baez, Pete Seeger, The Kingston Trio, Harry Belafonte, Odetta, Phil Ochs, and many other singer-songwriters to the public.

Girl groups and female singers, such as the Shirelles, Betty Everett, Little Eva, the Dixie Cups, the Ronettes, Martha and the Vandellas and the Supremes dominated the charts in the early 1960s. This style consisted typically of light pop themes about teenage romance and lifestyles, backed by vocal harmonies and a strong rhythm. Most girl groups were African-American, but white girl groups and singers, such as Lesley Gore, the Angels, and the Shangri-Las also emerged during this period.

Around the same time, record producer Phil Spector began producing girl groups and created a new kind of pop music production that came to be known as the Wall of Sound. This style emphasized higher budgets and more elaborate arrangements, and more melodramatic musical themes in place of a simple, light-hearted pop sound. Spector's innovations became integral to the growing sophistication of popular music from 1965 onward.

Also during the early 1960s, surf rock emerged, a rock subgenre that was centered in Southern California and based on beach and surfing themes, in addition to the usual songs about teenage romance and innocent fun. The Beach Boys quickly became the premier surf rock band and almost completely and single-handedly overshadowed the many lesser-known artists in the subgenre. Surf rock reached its peak in 1963–1965 before gradually being overtaken by bands influenced by the British Invasion and the counterculture movement.

The car song also emerged as a rock subgenre in the early 1960s, which focused on teenagers' fascination with car culture. The Beach Boys also dominated this subgenre, along with the duo Jan and Dean. Such notable songs include "Little Deuce Coupe", "409", and "Shut Down", all by the Beach Boys; Jan and Dean's "Little Old Lady from Pasadena" and "Drag City", Ronny and the Daytonas' "Little GTO", and many others. Like girl groups and surf rock, car songs also became overshadowed by the British Invasion and the counterculture movement.

The early 1960s also saw the golden age of another rock subgenre, the teen tragedy song, which focused on lost teen romance caused by sudden death, mainly in traffic accidents. Such songs included Mark Dinning's "Teen Angel", Ray Peterson's "Tell Laura I Love Her", Jan and Dean's "Dead Man's Curve", the Shangri-Las' "Leader of the Pack", and perhaps the subgenre's most popular, "Last Kiss" by J. Frank Wilson and the Cavaliers.

In the early 1960s, Britain became a hotbed of rock 'n' roll activity during this time. In late 1963, the Beatles embarked on their first US tour and cult singer Dusty Springfield released her first solo single. A few months later, rock 'n' roll founding father Chuck Berry emerged from a -year prison stint and resumed recording and touring. The stage was set for the spectacular revival of rock music.

In the UK, the Beatles played raucous rock 'n' roll – as well as doo wop, girl-group songs, show tunes – and wore leather jackets. Their manager Brian Epstein encouraged the group to wear suits. Beatlemania abruptly exploded after the group's appearance on The Ed Sullivan Show in 1964. Late in 1965, the Beatles released the album Rubber Soul which marked the beginning of their transition to a sophisticated power pop group with elaborate studio arrangements and production, and a year after that, they gave up touring entirely to focus only on albums. A host of imitators followed the Beatles in the so-called British Invasion, including groups like the Rolling Stones and the Kinks who would become legends in their own right.

As the counterculture movement developed, artists began making new kinds of music influenced by the use of psychedelic drugs. Guitarist Jimi Hendrix emerged onto the scene in 1967 with a radically new approach to electric guitar that replaced Chuck Berry, previously seen as the gold standard of rock guitar. Rock artists began to take on serious themes and social commentary/protest instead of simplistic pop themes.

A major development in popular music during the mid-1960s was the movement away from singles and towards albums. Previously, popular music was based around the 45 single (or even earlier, the 78 single) and albums such as they existed were little more than a hit single or two backed with filler tracks, instrumentals, and covers. The development of the AOR (album-oriented rock) format was complicated and involved several concurrent events such as Phil Spector's Wall of Sound, the introduction by Bob Dylan of "serious" lyrics to rock music, and the Beatles' new studio-based approach. In any case, after 1965 the vinyl LP had definitively taken over as the primary format for all popular music styles.

Blues also continued to develop strongly during the '60s, but after 1965, it increasingly shifted to the young white rock audience and away from its traditional black audience, which moved on to other styles such as soul and funk.

Jazz music and pop standards during the first half of the 1960s was largely a continuation of 1950s styles, retaining its core audience of young, urban, college-educated whites. By 1967, the death of several important jazz figures such as John Coltrane and Nat King Cole precipitated a decline in the genre. The takeover of rock in the late 1960s largely spelled the end of jazz and standards as mainstream forms of music, after they had dominated much of the first half of the 20th century.

Country music gained popularity on the West Coast, due in large part to the Bakersfield sound, led by Buck Owens and Merle Haggard. Female country artists were also becoming more mainstream (in a genre dominated by men in previous decades), with such acts as Patsy Cline, Loretta Lynn, and Tammy Wynette.

Significant events in music in the 1960s
 Elvis Presley returned to civilian life in the U.S. after two years away in the U.S. Army. He resumes his musical career by recording "It's Now or Never" and "Are You Lonesome Tonight?" in March 1960.
 Country music stars Patsy Cline, Cowboy Copas and Hawkshaw Hawkins were killed when their plane crashed in Camden, TN while returning home from a Kansas City benefit show in March 1963.
 In July 1964, a plane crash claimed the life of another country music legend, Jim Reeves, when the plane he was piloting crashed in a turbulent thunderstorm while on final approach to Nashville International Airport. 
 Sam Cooke was shot and killed at a motel in Los Angeles, California [11 December 1964] at age 33 under suspicious circumstances.
 Motown Record Corporation was founded in 1960. Its first Top Ten hit was "Shop Around" by the Miracles in 1960. "Shop Around" peaked at number-two on the Billboard Hot 100, and was Motown's first million-selling record.
 Newcastle born Eric Burdon and his Band "The Animals" hit the No. 1 in charts in the U.S. with their hit single, "The House of the Rising Sun" in 1964.
 Folksinger and activist Joan Baez released her debut album on Vanguard Records in December 1960.
 The Marvelettes scored Motown Record Corporation's first US  1 pop hit, "Please Mr. Postman" in 1961. Motown would score 110 Billboard Top-Ten hits during its run.
 The Four Seasons released three straight number one hits
 In a widely anticipated and publicized event, The Beatles arrive in America in February 1964, spearheading the British Invasion.
 The Mary Poppins Original Soundtrack tops record charts. Sherman Brothers receive Grammys and double Oscars.
 Lesley Gore at age 17 hits number one on Billboard with "It's My Party" and number two with "You Don't Own Me" behind the Beatles "I Want To Hold Your Hand".
 The Supremes scored twelve number-one hit singles between 1964 and 1969, beginning with "Where Did Our Love Go".
 The Kinks release "You Really Got Me" in August 1964, which tops the British charts; it is regarded as the first hard rock hit and a blueprint for related genres, such as heavy metal.
 John Coltrane released A Love Supreme in late 1964, considered among the most acclaimed jazz albums of the era.
 The Grateful Dead was formed in 1965 (originally The Warlocks) thus paving the way for the emergence of acid rock.
 Bob Dylan went electric at the 1965 Newport Folk Festival.
 Cilla Black's number-one hit "Anyone Who Had a Heart" still remains the top-selling single by a female artist in the UK from 1964.
 The Rolling Stones had a huge No. 1 hit with their song "(I Can't Get No) Satisfaction" in the summer of 1965.
 The Byrds released a cover of Bob Dylan's "Mr. Tambourine Man", which reached No. 1 on the U.S. charts and repeated the feat in the U.K. shortly thereafter. The extremely influential track effectively creates the musical subgenre of folk rock.
 Bob Dylan's "Like a Rolling Stone" is a top-five hit on both sides of the Atlantic during the summer of 1965.
 Bob Dylan's 1965 albums Bringing It All Back Home and Highway 61 Revisited ushered in album-focused rock and the "folk rock" genre.

 Simon and Garfunkel released "The Sound of Silence" single in 1965.
 The Beach Boys released Pet Sounds in 1966, which significantly influenced the Beatles' Sgt. Pepper's Lonely Hearts Club Band album released the following year.
 Bob Dylan was called "Judas" by an audience member during the Manchester Free Trade Hall concert, the start of the bootleg recording industry follows, with recordings of this concert circulating for 30 years – wrongly labeled as The Royal Albert Hall Concert – before a legitimate release in 1998 as The Bootleg Series Vol. 4: Bob Dylan Live 1966, The "Royal Albert Hall" Concert.
 In February 1966, Nancy Sinatra's song "These Boots Are Made for Walkin'" became very popular.
 In 1966, The Supremes A' Go-Go was the first album by a female group to reach the top position of the Billboard magazine pop albums chart in the United States.
 The Seekers were the first Australian Group to have a number one with "Georgy Girl" in 1966.
 Jefferson Airplane released the influential Surrealistic Pillow in 1967.
 The Velvet Underground released its self-titled debut album The Velvet Underground & Nico in 1967.
 The Doors released its self-titled debut album The Doors in January 1967.
 Love released Forever Changes in 1967.
 The Procol Harum released A Whiter Shade of Pale in 1967.
 Cream released "Disraeli Gears" in 1967.

 The Jimi Hendrix Experience released two successful albums during 1967, Are You Experienced and Axis: Bold as Love, that innovate both guitar, trio and recording techniques.
 The Moody Blues released the album Days of Future Passed in November 1967.
 R&B legend Otis Redding has his first No. 1 hit with "Sitting on the Dock of the Bay". He also played at the Monterey Pop Festival in 1967 just before he died in a plane crash.
 Pink Floyd released its debut record The Piper at the Gates of Dawn.
 Bob Dylan released the Country rock album John Wesley Harding in December 1967.
 The Bee Gees released their international debut album Bee Gees 1st in July 1967 which included the pop standard "To Love Somebody".
 The Monterey Pop Festival in 1967 was the beginning of the "Summer of Love".
 The Beatles released Sgt. Pepper's Lonely Hearts Club Band in 1967. It was nicknamed "The Soundtrack of the Summer of Love".
 Johnny Cash released At Folsom Prison in 1968.
 1968: after The Yardbirds fold, Led Zeppelin was formed by Jimmy Page and manager Peter Grant, with Robert Plant, John Bonham and John Paul Jones; and released their debut album Led Zeppelin.
 Big Brother and the Holding Company, with Janis Joplin as lead singer, became an overnight sensation after their performance at the Monterey Pop Festival in 1967 and released their second album Cheap Thrills in 1968.
 Gram Parsons with The Byrds released the influential LP Sweetheart of the Rodeo in late 1968, forming the basis for country rock.
 The Jimi Hendrix Experience released the influential double LP Electric Ladyland in 1968 that furthered the guitar and studio innovations of his previous two albums.
 Simon and Garfunkel released the single "Mrs. Robinson" in 1968; featured in the film The Graduate.
 Country music newcomer Jeannie C. Riley released the country and pop hit "Harper Valley PTA" in 1968, which is about a miniskirt-wearing mother of a teenage girl who was criticized by the local PTA for supposedly setting a bad example for her daughter but turns the tables by exposing some of the PTA members' wrongdoings. The song, along with Riley's mod persona in connection with it, apparently gave country music a "sexual revolution" of its own, as hemlines of other female country artists' stage dresses began rising in the years that followed.
 Sly & the Family Stone revolutionized black music with their 1968 hit single "Dance to the Music" and by 1969 became international sensations with the release of their hit record Stand!. The band cemented their position as a vital counterculture band when they performed at the Woodstock Festival.
 The Gun released "Race with the Devil" in October 1968.
 After a long performance drought, Elvis Presley made a successful return to TV and live performances after spending most of the decade making movies, beginning with his '68 Comeback Special in December 1968 on NBC, followed in 1969 by a summer engagement in Las Vegas. Presley's return to live performing set the stage for his many concert tours and continued Vegas engagements throughout the 1970s until his death in 1977.
 The Foundations released Build Me Up Buttercup in December 1968
 The Rolling Stones filmed the TV special The Rolling Stones Rock and Roll Circus in December 1968 but the film was not released for transmission. Considered for decades as a fabled "lost" performance until released in North America on Laserdisc and VHS in 1996. Features performances from The Who; The Dirty Mac featuring John Lennon, Eric Clapton and Mitch Mitchell; Jethro Tull and Taj Mahal.
 Spooky Tooth released their second album Spooky Two in March 1969. The album was an important hard rock milestone.
 The Woodstock Festival, and four months later, the Altamont Free Concert in 1969.
 The Who released and toured the first rock opera Tommy in 1969.
 Proto-punk band MC5 released the live album Kick Out the Jams in 1969.
 Captain Beefheart and his Magic Band released the Avant garde Trout Mask Replica in 1969.
 Creedence Clearwater Revival released "Fortunate Son" in 1969. The song amassed popularity with the Anti-war movement at the time and would later be used in films, TV shows, and video games depicting the Vietnam War or the U.S during the late 1960s and early 1970s.
 The Stooges released their debut album in 1969.
 The Beatles released Abbey Road in 1969.
 King Crimson released their debut album In the Court of the Crimson King in 1969.
 Led Zeppelin released two of their self-titled debut albums Led Zeppelin I and Led Zeppelin II in 1969.

Film

The highest-grossing film of the decade was 20th Century Fox's The Sound of Music (1965).

Some of Hollywood's most notable blockbuster films of the 1960s include:

 2001: A Space Odyssey
 The Apartment
 The Birds
 I Am Curious (Yellow)
 Bonnie and Clyde
 Breakfast at Tiffany's
 Bullitt
 Butch Cassidy and the Sundance Kid
 Carnival of Souls
 Cleopatra
 Cool Hand Luke
 The Dirty Dozen
 Doctor Zhivago
 Dr. Strangelove
 Easy Rider
 Exodus
 Faces
 Funny Girl
 Goldfinger
 The Graduate
 Guess Who's Coming to Dinner
 Head
 How the West Was Won
 The Hustler
 Ice Station Zebra
 In the Heat of the Night
 The Italian Job 
 It's a Mad, Mad, Mad, Mad World
 Jason and the Argonauts 
 Judgment at Nuremberg
 The Jungle Book
 Lawrence of Arabia
 The Lion in Winter
 The Longest Day
 The Love Bug
 A Man for All Seasons
 The Manchurian Candidate
 Mary Poppins
 Medium Cool
 Midnight Cowboy
 My Fair Lady
 Night of the Living Dead
 The Pink Panther
 The Odd Couple
 Oliver!
 One Hundred and One Dalmatians
 One Million Years B.C.
 Planet of the Apes
 Psycho
 Romeo and Juliet
 Rosemary's Baby
 The Sound of Music
 Spartacus
 Swiss Family Robinson
 The Sword in the Stone
 To Kill a Mockingbird
 Valley of the Dolls
 West Side Story
 Who's Afraid of Virginia Woolf?
 The Wild Bunch

The counterculture movement had a significant effect on cinema. Movies began to break social taboos such as sex and violence causing both controversy and fascination. They turned increasingly dramatic, unbalanced, and hectic as the cultural revolution was starting. This was the beginning of the New Hollywood era that dominated the next decade in theatres and revolutionized the film industry. Films of this time also focused on the changes happening in the world. Dennis Hopper's Easy Rider (1969) focused on the drug culture of the time. Movies also became more sexually explicit, such as Roger Vadim's Barbarella (1968) as the counterculture progressed.

In Europe, Art Cinema gains wider distribution and sees movements like la Nouvelle Vague (The French New Wave) featuring French filmmakers such as Roger Vadim, François Truffaut, Alain Resnais, and Jean-Luc Godard; Cinéma vérité documentary movement in Canada, France and the United States; Swedish filmmaker Ingmar Bergman, Chilean filmmaker Alexandro Jodorowsky and Polish filmmakers Roman Polanski and Wojciech Jerzy Has produced original and offbeat masterpieces and the high-point of Italian filmmaking with Michelangelo Antonioni and Federico Fellini making some of their most known films during this period. Notable films from this period include: La Dolce Vita, ; La Notte; L'Eclisse, The Red Desert; Blowup; Fellini Satyricon; Accattone; The Gospel According to St. Matthew; Theorem; Winter Light; The Silence; Persona; Shame; A Passion; Au Hasard Balthazar; Mouchette; Last Year at Marienbad; Chronique d'un été; Titicut Follies; High School; Salesman; La jetée; Warrendale; Knife in the Water; Repulsion; The Saragossa Manuscript; El Topo; A Hard Day's Night; and the cinema verite Dont Look Back.

In Japan, a film version of the story of the forty-seven ronin entitled Chushingura: Hana no Maki, Yuki no Maki directed by Hiroshi Inagaki was released in 1962, the legendary story was also remade as a television series in Japan. Academy Award-winning Japanese director Akira Kurosawa produced Yojimbo (1961), and Sanjuro (1962), which both starred Toshiro Mifune as a mysterious Samurai swordsman for hire. Like his previous films both had a profound influence around the world. The Spaghetti Western genre was a direct outgrowth of the Kurosawa films. The influence of these films is most apparent in Sergio Leone's A Fistful of Dollars (1964) starring Clint Eastwood and Walter Hill's Last Man Standing (1996). Yojimbo was also the origin of the "Man with No Name" trend which included Sergio Leone's For a Few Dollars More, and The Good, The Bad and The Ugly both also starring Clint Eastwood, and arguably continued through his 1968 opus Once Upon a Time in the West, starring Henry Fonda, Charles Bronson, Claudia Cardinale, and Jason Robards. The Magnificent Seven a 1960 American western film directed by John Sturges was a remake of Akira Kurosawa's 1954 film, Seven Samurai.

The 1960s were also about experimentation. With the explosion of lightweight and affordable cameras, the underground avant-garde film movement thrived. Canada's Michael Snow, Americans Kenneth Anger, Stan Brakhage, Andy Warhol, and Jack Smith. Notable films in this genre are: Dog Star Man; Scorpio Rising; Wavelength; Chelsea Girls; Blow Job; Vinyl; Flaming Creatures.

Aside of Walt Disney's most important blockbusters One Hundred and One Dalmatians, Mary Poppins and The Jungle Book, Animated feature films which are of notable status include Gay Purr-ee, Hey There, It's Yogi Bear!, The Man Called Flintstone, Mad Monster Party?, Yellow Submarine and A Boy Named Charlie Brown.

Significant events in the film industry in the 1960s
Removal of the Motion Picture Association of America's Production Code in 1967.
The decline and end of the Studio system.
The rise of "art house" films and theaters.
The end of the classical hollywood cinema era.
The beginning of the New Hollywood Era due to the counterculture.
The rise of independent producers that worked outside the Studio System.
Move to all-color production in Hollywood films.
The invention of the Nagra 1/4", sync-sound, portable open-reel tape deck.
Expo 67 where new film formats like Imax were invented and new ways of displaying film were tested.
Flat-bed film editing tables appear, like the Steenbeck, they eventually replace the Moviola editing platform.
The French New Wave.
Direct Cinema and Cinéma vérité documentaries.
The beginning of the Golden Age of Porn in 1969, which continued throughout the 1970s and into the first half of the 1980s.

Television

The most prominent TV series of the 1960s include: Doctor Who, The Ed Sullivan Show, Coronation Street, Star Trek, Peyton Place, The Twilight Zone, The Outer Limits, The Andy Williams Show, The Dean Martin Show, The Wonderful World of Disney, Alfred Hitchcock Presents, The Beverly Hillbillies, Bonanza, Batman, McHale's Navy, Laugh-In, The Dick Van Dyke Show, The Fugitive, The Tonight Show, Gunsmoke, The Andy Griffith Show, Gilligan's Island, Mission: Impossible, The Flintstones, The Adventures of Ozzie and Harriet, Lassie, The Danny Thomas Show, The Lucy Show, My Three Sons, The Red Skelton Show, Bewitched and I Dream of Jeannie. The Flintstones was a favoured show, receiving 40 million views an episode with an average of 3 million views a day. Some programming such as The Smothers Brothers Comedy Hour became controversial by challenging the foundations of America's corporate and governmental controls; making fun of world leaders, and questioning U.S. involvement in and escalation of the Vietnam War.

Walt Disney, the founder of the Walt Disney Co. died on 15 December 1966, from a major tumor in his left lung.

Fashion

Significant fashion trends of the 1960s include:
 The Beatles exerted an enormous influence on young men's fashions and hairstyles in the 1960s which included most notably the mop-top haircut, the Beatle boots and the Nehru jacket.
 The hippie movement late in the decade also had a strong influence on clothing styles, including bell-bottom jeans, tie-dye and batik fabrics, as well as paisley prints.
 The bikini came into fashion in 1963 after being featured in the film Beach Party.
 Mary Quant popularised the miniskirt, which became one of the most popular fashion rages in the late 1960s among young women and teenage girls. Its popularity continued throughout the first half of the 1970s and then disappeared temporarily from mainstream fashion before making a comeback in the mid-1980s.
 Men's mainstream hairstyles ranged from the pompadour, the crew cut, the flattop hairstyle, the tapered hairstyle, and short, parted hair in the early part of the decade, to longer parted hairstyles with sideburns towards the latter half of the decade.
 Women's mainstream hairstyles ranged from beehive hairdos, the bird's nest hairstyle, and the chignon hairstyle in the early part of the decade, to very short styles popularized by Twiggy and Mia Farrow in Rosemary's Baby towards the latter half of the decade.
 African-American hairstyles for men and women included the afro.

Literature

Sports

Olympics
There were six Olympic Games held during the decade. These were:
 1960 Summer Olympics 25 August – 11 September 1960, in Rome, Italy
 1960 Winter Olympics 18–28 February 1960, in Squaw Valley, California, United States
 1964 Summer Olympics 10–24 October 1964, in Tokyo, Japan
 1964 Winter Olympics 29 January – 9 February 1964, in Innsbruck, Austria
 1968 Summer Olympics 12–27 October 1968, in Mexico City, Mexico
 1968 Winter Olympics 6–18 February 1968, in Grenoble, France

Association football
There were two FIFA World Cups during the decade:
 1962 FIFA World Cup hosted in Chile, won by Brazil
 1966 FIFA World Cup hosted and won by England

Baseball
The first wave of Major League Baseball expansion in 1961 included the formation of the Los Angeles Angels, the move to Minnesota to become the Minnesota Twins by the former Washington Senators and the formation of a new franchise called the Washington Senators. Major League Baseball sanctioned both the Houston Colt .45s and the New York Mets as new National League franchises in 1962.

In 1969, the American League expanded when the Kansas City Royals and Seattle Pilots, were admitted to the league prompting the expansion of the post-season (in the form of the League Championship Series) for the first time since the creation of the World Series. The Pilots stayed just one season in Seattle before moving and becoming the Milwaukee Brewers in 1970. The National League also added two teams in 1969, the Montreal Expos and San Diego Padres. By 1969, the New York Mets won the World Series in only the 8th year of the team's existence.

Basketball
The NBA tournaments during the 1960s were dominated by the Boston Celtics, who won eight straight titles from 1959 to 1966 and added two more consecutive championships in 1968 and 1969, aided by such players as Bob Cousy, Bill Russell and John Havlicek. Other notable NBA players included Wilt Chamberlain, Elgin Baylor, Jerry West and Oscar Robertson.

At the NCAA level, the UCLA Bruins also proved dominant. Coached by John Wooden, they were helped by Lew Alcindor and by Bill Walton to win championships and dominate the American college basketball landscape during the decade.

Disc sports (Frisbee)
Alternative sports, using the flying disc, began in the mid-sixties. As numbers of young people became alienated from social norms, they resisted and looked for alternatives. They would form what would become known as the counterculture. The forms of escape and resistance would manifest in many ways including social activism, alternative lifestyles, experimental living through foods, dress, music and alternative recreational activities, including that of throwing a Frisbee. Starting with promotional efforts from Wham-O and Irwin Toy (Canada), a few tournaments and professionals using Frisbee show tours to perform at universities, fairs and sporting events, disc sports such as freestyle, double disc court, guts, disc ultimate and disc golf became this sports first events. Two sports, the team sport of disc ultimate and disc golf are very popular worldwide and are now being played semiprofessionally. The World Flying Disc Federation, Professional Disc Golf Association and the Freestyle Players Association are the official rules and sanctioning organizations for flying disc sports worldwide. Major League Ultimate (MLU) and the American Ultimate Disc League (AUDL) are the first semi-professional ultimate leagues.

Racing
In motorsports, the Can-Am and Trans-Am series were both established in 1966. The Ford GT40 won outright in the 24 Hours of Le Mans. Graham Hill edged out Jackie Stewart and Denny Hulme for the World Championship in Formula One.

People

Activists
Some activist leaders of the 1960s period include:

 Joan Baez
 James Baldwin
 James Bevel
 Stokely Carmichael
 Rennie Davis
 David Dellinger
 Bob Dylan
 Medgar Evers
 Michael Farrell
 Lawrence Ferlinghetti
 Allen Ginsberg
 Dick Gregory
 Abbie Hoffman
 Jesse Jackson
 Barbara Jordan
 Bernard Lafayette
 Timothy Leary
 John Lennon
 John Lewis
 Martin Luther King Jr.
 James Meredith
 Diane Nash
 Phil Ochs
 Yoko Ono 
 Jerry Rubin
 Mario Savio
 Fred Shuttlesworth
 Gloria Steinem
 Malcolm X
 Andrew Young

Actors and entertainers

 Eddie Albert
 Jack Albertson
 Steve Allen
 Woody Allen
 Julie Andrews
 James Arness
 Fred Astaire
 Richard Attenborough
 Stéphane Audran
 Charles Aznavour
 Carroll Baker
 Barbara Bain
 Lucille Ball
 Martin Balsam
 Anne Bancroft
 Brigitte Bardot
 Richard Basehart
 Alan Bates
 Anne Baxter
 Warren Beatty
 Jean-Paul Belmondo
 Robert Blake
 Mel Blanc
 Brian Blessed
 Dirk Bogarde
 Richard Boone
 Shirley Booth
 Ernest Borgnine
 Tom Bosley
 Stephen Boyd
 Marlon Brando
 Lloyd Bridges
 Charles Bronson
 Mel Brooks
 Jim Brown
 Lenny Bruce
 Yul Brynner
 Richard Burton
 Raymond Burr
 Sid Caesar
 Michael Caine
 Rory Calhoun
 Claudia Cardinale
 Yvonne De Carlo
 Leslie Caron
 John Carradine
 Diahann Carroll
 Johnny Carson
 John Cassavetes
 George Chakiris
 Charlie Chaplin
 Julie Christie
 Lee Van Cleef
 Montgomery Clift
 Lee J. Cobb
 James Coburn
 Joan Collins
 Sean Connery
 Chuck Connors
 Robert Conrad
 Bill Cosby
 Tom Courtenay
 Bob Crane
 Johnny Crawford
 Bing Crosby
 Robert Culp
 Tony Curtis
 Peter Cushing
 Sammy Davis Jr.
 Doris Day
 Ruby Dee
 Sandra Dee
 Alain Delon
 Catherine Deneuve
 Brandon deWilde
 Angie Dickinson
 Troy Donahue
 Diana Dors
 Kirk Douglas
 James Drury
 Patty Duke
 Faye Dunaway
 Robert Duvall
 Dick Van Dyke
 Clint Eastwood
 Barbara Eden
 Anita Ekberg
 Peter Falk
 Mia Farrow
 Mel Ferrer
 José Ferrer
 Peter Finch
 Albert Finney
 Jo Van Fleet
 Henry Fonda
 Jane Fonda
 Peter Fonda
 Glenn Ford
 John Forsythe
 Anthony Franciosa
 Louis de Funès
 Clark Gable
 Eva Gabor
 Zsa Zsa Gabor
 James Garner
 Judy Garland
 Vittorio Gassman
 Jackie Gleason
 Cary Grant
 Stewart Granger
 Lorne Greene
 Andy Griffith
 Alec Guinness
 Fred Gwynne
 Gene Hackman
 Larry Hagman
 Jonathan Harris
 Richard Harris
 William Hartnell
 Tippi Hedren
 Van Heflin
 Audrey Hepburn
 Katharine Hepburn
 Charlton Heston
 Dustin Hoffman
 William Holden
 James Hong
 Dennis Hopper
 Bob Hope
 Rock Hudson
 Jeffrey Hunter
 Tab Hunter
 John Ireland
 Burl Ives
 Glynis Johns
 Carolyn Jones
 Shirley Jones
 Katy Jurado
 Anna Karina
 Danny Kaye
 Brian Keith
 George Kennedy
 Gene Kelly
 Grace Kelly
 Jack Kelly
 Eartha Kitt
 Jack Klugman
 Don Knotts
 Martin Landau
 Burt Lancaster
 Angela Lansbury
 Peter Lawford
 Cloris Leachman
 Bruce Lee
 Christopher Lee
 Janet Leigh
 Jack Lemmon
 Jerry Lewis
 Robert Loggia
 Gina Lollobrigida
 Julie London
 Sophia Loren
 Peter Lorre
 Darren McGavin
 Fred MacMurray
 Shirley MacLaine
 Jayne Mansfield
 Karl Malden
 Dorothy Malone
 Dean Martin
 Lee Marvin
 James Mason
 Marcello Mastroianni
 David McCallum
 Roddy McDowall
 Steve McQueen
 Burgess Meredith
 Toshiro Mifune
 Vera Miles
 Sal Mineo
 Robert Mitchum
 Elizabeth Montgomery
 Roger Moore
 Marilyn Monroe
 Jeanne Moreau
 Rita Moreno
 Harry Morgan
 Robert Morse
 Don Murray
 Patricia Neal
 Paul Newman
 Julie Newmar
 Barbara Nichols
 Nichelle Nichols
 Leslie Nielsen
 Leonard Nimoy
 David Niven
 Kim Novak
 Maureen O'Hara
 Laurence Olivier
 Peter O'Toole
 Geraldine Page
 Janis Paige
 Eleanor Parker
 Jack Palance
 Gregory Peck
 George Peppard
 Anthony Perkins
 Michel Piccoli
 Donald Pleasence
 Suzanne Pleshette
 Christopher Plummer
 Sidney Poitier
 Paula Prentiss
 Elvis Presley
 Vincent Price
 Anthony Quayle
 Anthony Quinn
 Tony Randall
 Lynn Redgrave
 Michael Redgrave
 Vanessa Redgrave
 Oliver Reed
 Robert Reed
 Carl Reiner
 Lee Remick
 Don Rickles
 Diana Rigg
 Thelma Ritter
 Robert Redford
 Burt Reynolds
 Debbie Reynolds
 Jason Robards
 Cliff Robertson
 Edward G. Robinson
 Cesar Romero
 Mickey Rooney
 Barbara Rush
 Eva Marie Saint
 George Sanders
 Telly Savalas
 John Saxon
 Maximilian Schell
 George C. Scott
 George Segal
 Jean Seberg
 Edie Sedgwick
 Peter Sellers
 Omar Sharif
 William Shatner
 Jean Simmons
 Frank Sinatra
 Ann Sothern
 Robert Stack
 Terence Stamp
 James Stewart
 Barbra Streisand
 Woody Strode
 Barry Sullivan
 Ed Sullivan
 Donald Sutherland
 Max von Sydow
 Sharon Tate
 Jacques Tati
 Elizabeth Taylor
 Rod Taylor
 Jean-Louis Trintignant
 Patrick Troughton
 Cicely Tyson
 Raf Vallone
 Robert Vaughn
 Robert Wagner
 Eli Wallach
 Burt Ward
 John Wayne
 Raquel Welch
 Adam West
 Stuart Whitman
 Richard Widmark
 Jonathan Winters
 Shelley Winters
 Natalie Wood
 Joanne Woodward
 Keenan Wynn
 Efrem Zimbalist Jr.

Filmmakers

 Alfred Hitchcock
 Stanley Kubrick
 Ingmar Bergman
 Federico Fellini
 Orson Welles
 Roman Polanski
 Akira Kurosawa
 Ishiro Honda
 Jean-Luc Godard
 Pier Paolo Pasolini
 François Truffaut
 Sergio Leone
 David Lean
 Sidney Lumet
 John Ford
 Dennis Hopper
 John Huston
 John Sturges
 Sam Peckinpah
 Billy Wilder
 Blake Edwards
 Arthur Penn
 Michelangelo Antonioni
 Alain Resnais
 Claude Chabrol
 George Romero
 Eric Rohmer
 Don Siegel
 Jean Rouch
 Robert Mulligan
 Andreï Tarkovsky
 Luchino Visconti
 Jerry Lewis
 Luis Buñuel
 Joseph Losey
 Richard Fleisher
 Joseph L. Mankiewicz
 John Huston
 Luigi Comencini
 Elia Kazan
 Stuart Rosenberg
 Woody Allen
 Mike Nichols
 Robert Wise
 Norman Jewison
 Mario Bava
 Lucio Fulci
 Robert Aldrich
 Stanley Kramer
 Howard Hawks
 Jacques Tati
 Lewis Milestone
 Mikhaïl Kalatozov
 Stanley Donen
 George Cukor
 John Frankenheimer
 Sydney Pollack
 Ken Loach
 Michael Powell
 Anthony Mann
 Jack Clayton
 Vittorio De Sica
 Gene Roddenberry

Musicians

 Paul Anka
 Louis Armstrong
 Eddy Arnold
 Chet Atkins
 Burt Bacharach
 Joan Baez
 Pearl Bailey
 Tony Bennett
 Chuck Berry
 Art Blakey
 Bobby Bland
 Pat Boone
 David Bowie
 James Brown
 Solomon Burke
 Jerry Butler
 Glen Campbell
 Johnny Cash
 Ray Charles
 Chubby Checker
 Lou Christie
 Eric Clapton
 Dee Clark
 Petula Clark
 Patsy Cline
 Rosemary Clooney
 Nat "King" Cole
 Sam Cooke
 Leonard Cohen
 John Coltrane
 King Crimson
 Bing Crosby
 Bobby Darin
 Miles Davis
 Sammy Davis Jr.
 Delia Derbyshire
 Neil Diamond
 Bo Diddley
 Dion DiMucci
 Fats Domino
 Bob Dylan
 Duke Ellington
 Art Farmer
 Eddie Fisher
 Ella Fitzgerald
 Tennessee Ernie Ford
 Aretha Franklin
 Marvin Gaye
 Robin Gibb
 Dizzy Gillespie
 Eydie Gormé
 Buddy Guy
 Merle Haggard
 Lena Horne
 Burl Ives
 Etta James
 Sonny James
 Waylon Jennings
 George Jones
 Quincy Jones
 Tom Jones
 Janis Joplin
 B.B. King
 Ben E. King
 Freddie King
 Eartha Kitt
 Frankie Laine
 Brenda Lee
 Peggy Lee
 Jerry Lee Lewis
 Loretta Lynn
 Manfred Mann
 Bob Marley
 Dean Martin
 Johnny Mathis
 Curtis Mayfield
 Barry McGuire
 Roger Miller
 Charles Mingus
 Guy Mitchell
 Joni Mitchell
 Thelonious Monk
 Bill Monroe
 Wes Montgomery
 Jim Morrison
 Ricky Nelson
 Sandy Nelson
 Willie Nelson
 Phil Ochs
 Roy Orbison
 Buck Owens
 Dolly Parton
 Elvis Presley
 Ray Price
 Charley Pride
 Lou Rawls
 Jerry Reed
 Jimmy Reed
 Lou Reed
 Della Reese
 Otis Redding
 Cliff Richard
 Little Richard
 Jeannie C. Riley
 Tex Ritter
 Max Roach
 Marty Robbins
 Jimmy Rodgers
 Sonny Rollins
 Neil Sedaka
 Pete Seeger
 Nina Simone
 Frank Sinatra
 Hank Snow
 Rod Stewart
 Joan Sutherland
 Hank Thompson
 Conway Twitty
 Ernest Tubb
 Big Joe Turner
 Ike & Tina Turner
 Sarah Vaughan
 Bobby Vee
 Gene Vincent
 Porter Wagoner
 Dionne Warwick
 Dinah Washington
 Muddy Waters
 Kitty Wells
 Dottie West
 Howlin' Wolf
 Andy Williams
 Jackie Wilson
 Nancy Wilson
 Stevie Wonder
 Faron Young
 Neil Young
 Frank Zappa

Bands

 The Beatles
 The Beach Boys
 The Supremes
 The Rolling Stones
 The Jimi Hendrix Experience
 Pink Floyd
 Led Zeppelin
 Jefferson Airplane
 The Mamas & the Papas
 Creedence Clearwater Revival
 Simon and Garfunkel
 The Animals
 The Doors
 Cream
 The Jackson 5
 The Righteous Brothers
 Grateful Dead
 The Velvet Underground
 The Shadows
 The Yardbirds
 Moody Blues
 The Who
 The Kinks
 Iron Butterfly
 Blood, Sweat and Tears
 The Four Tops
 The Temptations
 The Zombies
 Herb Alpert & the Tijuana Brass
 The Ronettes
 The Mothers of Invention
 The Hollies
 The Stooges
 Santana
 The Marvelettes
 Procol Harum
 The Monkees
 The Miracles
 The Impressions
 Gladys Knight & the Pips

Writers

 Kurt Vonnegut
 Isaac Asimov
 Ray Bradbury
 Dr. Seuss
 Gabriel Garcia Marquez
 Arthur Miller
 Sylvia Plath
 Philip K. Dick
 Carlos Castaneda
 Truman Capote
 John Steinbeck
 Arthur C. Clarke
 Harper Lee
 Jack Kerouac
 Robert Heinlein
 Ken Kesey
 Joseph Heller
 Henry Miller
 Hunter S. Thompson
 Edward Albee
 Gore Vidal
 William S. Burroughs
 Frank Herbert
 Charles M. Schultz
 Anthony Burgess
 Thomas Pinchon
 Tom Stoppard
 Seamus Heaney
 Joseph Campbell
 Edward Abbey
 Norman Podhoretz
 Amiri Baraka
 James Graham Ballard
 Noël Coward
 Philip Larkin
 Agatha Christie
 James Baldwin
 Lorraine Hansberry

Sports figures

 Hank Aaron
 Muhammad Ali
 Ernie Banks
 Gordon Banks
 Elgin Baylor
 Yogi Berra
 George Best
 Abebe Bikila
 Lou Brock
 Jim Brown
 Giacomo Bulgarelli
 Matt Busby
 Dick Butkus
 John Carlos
 Věra Čáslavská
 Wilt Chamberlain
 Bobby Charlton
 Jack Charlton
 Roberto Clemente
 Otis Davis
 Alfredo Di Stefano
 Yukio Endō
 Lee Evans
 Eusebio
 Garrincha
 Bob Gibson
 Charles Greene
 John Havlicek
 Bob Hayes
 Jim Hines
 Geoff Hurst
 Giacinto Facchetti
 Peggy Fleming
 Paul Hornung
 Vince Lombardi
 Rafer Johnson
 Sam Jones
 K. C. Jones
 Kipchoge Keino
 Mickey Mantle
 Vincent Matthews
 Willie Mays
 Willie McCovey
 Bobby Moore
 Pedro Morales
 Joe Namath
 Jack Nicklaus
 Ray Nitschke
 Al Oerter
 Arnold Palmer
 Pelé
 Richard Petty
 Brian Piccolo
 Ferenc Puskás
 Alf Ramsey
 Oscar Robertson
 Frank Robinson
 Bobby Robson
 Bill Russell
 Satch Sanders
 Gale Sayers
 Bill Shankly
 Ronnie Ray Smith
 Tommie Smith
 Bart Starr
 Giovanni Trapattoni
 Johnny Unitas
 Jerry West
 Fred Williamson
 Mamo Wolde
 Lev Yashin

See also

 1960s decor
 Baby Boomers (people who were children or teenagers during this decade)
 List of underground newspapers of the 1960s counterculture
 The Sixties Unplugged (book)

Timelines
The following articles contain brief timelines which list the most prominent events of the decade:

1960 • 1961 • 1962 • 1963 • 1964 • 1965 • 1966 • 1967 • 1968 • 1969 • Timeline of 1960s counterculture

References

Further reading
 Anastakis, Dimitry, ed. The Sixties: passion, politics, and style (McGill-Queen's Press-MQUP, 2008.) Canadian emphasis
 Baugess, James S., and Abbe Debolt, eds. Encyclopedia of the Sixties: A Decade of Culture and Counterculture (2 vol, 2012; also E-book) 871pp; 500 entries by scholars excerpt and text search; online review
 Berton, Pierre. 1967: the Last Good Year (Toronto: Doubleday Canada, 1997). Canadian events
 Brooks, Victor. Last Season of Innocence: The Teen Experience in the 1960s (Rowman & Littlefield, 2012) 207 pp.
 Brown, Timothy Scott. West Germany and the Global Sixties (2013)
 Christiansen, Samantha and Zachary Scarlett, ed. The Third World and the Global 1960s (New York: Berghahn, 2013) Introduction
 Farber, David, and Beth Bailey, eds. The Columbia guide to America in the 1960s (Columbia University Press, 2003).
 Farber, David, ed. The Sixties: From Memory to History (1994), Scholarly essays on the United States
 Flamm, Michael W. and David Steigerwald. Debating the 1960s: Liberal, Conservative, and Radical Perspectives (2007) on USA
 Isserman, Maurice, and Michael Kazin. America divided: The civil war of the 1960s (6th ed. Oxford UP, 2020).
 Marwick, Arthur. The Sixties: Cultural Revolution in Britain, France, Italy, and the United States, c.1958-c.1974 (Oxford University Press, 1998)
 Matusow, Allen, The Unraveling of America: A History of Liberalism in the 1960s (1984) excerpt
 Padva, Gilad. Animated Nostalgia and Invented Authenticity in Arte's Summer of the Sixties. In Padva, Gilad, Queer Nostalgia in Cinema and Pop Culture, pp. 13–34 (Palgrave Macmillan, 2014).
 Palmer, Bryan D. Canada's 1960s: The Ironies of Identity in a Rebellious Era. Toronto: University of Toronto Press, 2009.
 Sandbrook, Dominic. Never Had It So Good: A History of Britain from Suez to the Beatles (2006) 928pp; excerpt and text search
 Sandbrook, Dominic. White Heat: A History of Britain in the Swinging Sixties (2 vol 2007)
 Strain, Christopher B. The Long Sixties: America, 1955–1973 (Wiley, 2017). xii, 204 pp. 
 Unger, Debi, and Irwin Unger, eds.  The Times Were a Changin': The Sixties Reader (1998) excerpt and text search

Historiography
 DeKoven, Marianne. The Sixties and the Emergence of the Postmodern (Duke University Press, 2004)
 Farber, David R. The Sixties: From Memory to History (1994) excerpt and text search
 
 Hunt, Andrew. "When Did the Sixties Happen? Searching for New Directions", Journal of Social History (1999) 33#1 pp 147–161.
 Meyer, James. The Art of Return: The Sixties and Contemporary Culture (University of Chicago Press, 2019). 
 Pensado, Jaime. "The (forgotten) Sixties in Mexico." The Sixties: A Journal of History, Politics and Culture(2008) 1#1: 83–90.
 Rising, George Goodwin. "Stuck in the sixties: Conservatives and the legacies of the 1960s." (PhD U. of Arizona, 2003). 
 Ira Chernus, "When Did "the '60s" Begin? A Cautionary Tale for Historians" 4 Feb 2014, History News Network
 "1964" (PBS documentary, 2013)

External links

 The 1960s: A Bibliography 
 CBC Digital Archives 1960s a GoGo
 The Sixties Project
 Heroes of the 1960s slideshow by Life magazine
 The 60s: Literary Tradition and Social Change, exhibit at the University of Virginia, Library, Special Collections.
 1960s protest movements in America
 The 1960s in Europe (Online Teaching and Research Guide)
 
 The 1960s articles, video, pictures, and facts

 
20th century
1960s decade overviews